The 1993 William & Mary Tribe football team represented the College of William & Mary as member of the Mid-Atlantic Division of the Yankee Conference during the 1993 NCAA Division I-AA football season. Led by Jimmye Laycock in his 14th year as head coach, William & Mary finished the season with an overall record of 9–3 and a mark of 7–1 in Yankee Conference play, winning the Mid-Atlantic Division title. They were ranked No. 10 in the final Sports Network poll. The Tribe qualified for the NCAA Division I-AA playoffs, losing in the first round before to McNeese State.

Schedule

References

William and Mary
William & Mary Tribe football seasons
William and Mary Indians football